Rosedale may refer to:

Places

Australia
Rosedale, New South Wales, a settlement
Rosedale, Queensland, a town
Rosedale, South Australia, a town
Rosedale, Victoria, a town
Shire of Rosedale, Victoria, a former local government area

Canada
Rosedale, Alberta, a community
Rosedale, Calgary, Alberta, a residential neighborhood
Rosedale, Chilliwack, British Columbia, a community
Rural Municipality of Rosedale No. 283, Saskatchewan
Rural Municipality of Rosedale, Manitoba
Rosedale, Ontario
Rosedale, Toronto, Ontario
Rosedale (electoral district)
Rosedale River, Ontario

New Zealand
Rosedale, Auckland, a suburb
Rosedale, Invercargill, a suburb

United Kingdom
Rosedale, Cheshunt
Rosedale, North Yorkshire, a valley

United States

Communities
Rosedale, California, a census-designated place
Rosedale, Colorado, a former municipality
Rosedale Township, Jersey County, Illinois
Rosedale, Illinois, an unincorporated community
Rosedale, Indiana, a town
Rosedale, Kansas, a community
Rosedale, Louisiana, a village
Rosedale, Maryland, an unincorporated community and census-designated place
Rosedale Township, Mahnomen County, Minnesota
Rosedale, Mississippi, a city
Rosedale, Nebraska, a ghost town
Rosedale, Hammonton, New Jersey, an unincorporated community
Rosedale, Mercer County, New Jersey
Rosedal, New Mexico, a census-designated place
Rosedale, Ohio, an unincorporated community
Rosedale, Defiance County, Ohio, an unincorporated community
Rosedale, Oklahoma, a town
Rosedale, Oregon, an unincorporated community
Rosedale, Virginia, an unincorporated community
Rosedale, Washington, a census-designated place
Rosedale, West Virginia, an unincorporated community

Neighborhoods
Rosedale, Colorado, part of the city of Greeley
Rosedale, Kansas, a neighborhood in Kansas City
Rosedale, Queens, New York, a neighborhood in New York City
Rosedale, Austin, Texas, a neighborhood in central Austin, Texas
Rosedale, a neighborhood in northeast Washington, D.C.

Other places
Rosedale Historic District (Homewood, Alabama), on the National Register of Historic Places listings in Alabama
Rosedale (Middletown, Delaware), listed on the National Register of Historic Places (NRHP) in Delaware
Rosedale Center, a regional shopping mall in Roseville, Minnesota
Rosedale (Columbus, Mississippi), listed on the NRHP in Mississippi
Rosedale Historic District (Rosedale, Mississippi), on the National Register of Historic Places listings in Mississippi
Rosedale (Charlotte, North Carolina), listed on the NRHP in North Carolina
Rosedale (Washington, North Carolina), listed on the NRHP in North Carolina
Rosedale Historic District (Covington, Virginia), listed on the NRHP in Virginia
Rosedale (Lynchburg, Virginia), listed on the NRHP in Virginia
Rosedale (Washington, D.C.), listed on the NRHP in Washington, D.C.
Rosedale Plantation, Vaughn, Mississippi
Rosedale, the former name of an estate in Cleveland Park in northwest Washington, D.C.

Transportation
Rosedale Railway, a former railway line in North Yorkshire, England
SS Rosedale, a ship wrecked in 1893 at St Ives, Cornwall, England
Rosedale (ferry), a ship from 1910 at Hoboken, New Jersey
Rosedale Avenue (Bronx), a very wide street in Soundview, Bronx, New York City
Rosedale Highway, a portion of California State Route 58
Rosedale railway station, Rosedale, Victoria, Australia
Rosedale station (Toronto), a subway stop in Toronto, Canada
Rosedale station (LIRR), a train station in Queens, New York City

People
Philip Rosedale (born 1968), American entrepreneur
Ron Rosedale M.D., specialist in nutritional and metabolic medicine

Schools
Rosedale College, a mixed secondary school and sixth form in the London Borough of Hillingdon, England
Rosedale Bible College, Rosedale, Ohio, United States
Rosedale Elementary School (disambiguation)

Other uses
Rosedale Presbyterian Church, Rosedale, Toronto, Canada
Rosedale Odd Fellows Temple, Boise, Idaho, on the National Register of Historic Places